The Nana Barya River is a river in Central Africa. It arises in the west of the Central African Republic in the prefecture Ouham-Pendé and flows northeast, forming part of the international boundary between the Central African Republic and Chad. In Chad it flows into the Ouham River. The Nana Barya Faunal Reserve is named after this River.

See also
 List of rivers of the Central African Republic

Rivers of the Central African Republic
Rivers of Chad
International rivers of Africa
Central African Republic–Chad border